The Maltese Premier League, known as BOV Premier League for sponsorship reasons with Bank of Valletta (colloquially known as Il-Kampjonat Premjer), is the highest level of professional football in Malta. Managed by the Malta Football Association, the Premier League is contested by 16 teams and operates on a promotion and relegation system with the Challenge League. As of June 2022, the Premier League ranks 46th out of 55 members in the UEFA coefficient.

The league was first competed in 1909 as the First Division, before switching to its current name in 1980; the First Division in turn replaced the Second Division. Sliema Wanderers and Floriana have won the title a record 26 times. The current champions are Ħamrun Spartans who won their 9th title in the 2022–23 season.

Format 

 5 clubs: 1909–1912
 8 clubs: 1912–1913
 7 clubs: 1913–1914
 6 clubs: 1914–1917
 8 clubs: 1917–1918
 5 clubs: 1918–1919
 6 clubs: 1919–1920
 9 clubs: 1920–1921
 7 clubs: 1921–1922
 6 clubs: 1922–1923
 5 clubs: 1923–1924
 8 clubs: 1924–1925
 7 clubs: 1925–1926
 4 clubs: 1926–1927
 7 clubs: 1927–1928
 3 clubs: 1928–1929
 5 clubs: 1929–1930
 4 clubs: 1930–1933
 2 clubs: 1933–1934
 7 clubs: 1934–1935
 3 clubs: 1935–1936
 4 clubs: 1936–1945
 7 clubs: 1945–1946
 8 clubs: 1946–1964
 7 clubs: 1964–1965
 6 clubs: 1965–1967
 8 clubs: 1967–1971
 10 clubs: 1971–1980
 8 clubs: 1980–1988
 9 clubs: 1988–1991
 10 clubs: 1991–2011
 12 clubs: 2011–2017
 14 clubs: 2017–2020
 16 clubs: 2020–2021
 12 clubs: 2021–2022
 14 clubs: 2022–

The Premier League consists of one round. In the First Round, every team plays each opponent twice, once "home" and once "away" (in actuality, the designation of home and away is purely arbitrary as most of the clubs do not have their own grounds), for a total of 26 games. Teams receive three points for a win and one point for a draw. No points are awarded for a loss. The club with the most points is crowned as champion. If two teams are tied in points (for decide champions, for relegation or for UEFA competitions), there will be no tie-breakers will play a decider match. If three or more teams are tied in points (for decide champions, for relegation or for UEFA competitions), there will be check by Head-to-head points and the best two teams will play a decider match

To determine the champion or qualification to UEFA competitions, a play-off is played to determine the winner. The two lowest placed teams are relegated into the Challenge League and the twelfth-placed team plays a play-off against the third-placed team from the First Division with the winner either keeping their place or get promoted to the top-tier league.

European qualification 

Clubs finishing the season in the top positions of the Premier League are granted qualification to compete in one of UEFA's European competition. This is determined by Malta's position in the UEFA coefficients ranking system.

The league winner qualifies to the first qualifying round for the UEFA Champions League. The second- and third-placed teams qualify for the first qualifying round for the UEFA Europa Conference League, respectively. An additional Europa Conference League place is taken through the country's domestic cup competition, the FA Trophy. If the winner of the FA Trophy qualifies for Europe through their league position, the fourth-placed team in the league qualifies for the UEFA Europa Conference League's first qualifying round.

League committees 

The Premier Division Standing Committee (PDSC) is a body composed of the Premier League club presidents who represent their club on a board. These do not have executive powers but are a formal body that has official influence with regards to rules, regulations and issues that relate to the league. From time to time the committee makes proposals to the respective and MFA bodies for approval.

Venues

Clubs

Seasons in Maltese Premier League

There are 37 teams that have taken part in the Maltese Premier League that was played from the 1945-46 (The 1945-46 season introduced promotion and relegation, and when the MFA change the rules of the clubs that every locality they have to represent one club.) season until the 2022-23 season.

 78 seasons: Valletta F.C., Hibernians F.C.
 77 seasons: Floriana F.C.
 76 seasons: Sliema Wanderers F.C.
 68 seasons: Ħamrun Spartans F.C.
 57 seasons: Birkirkara F.C.
 28 seasons: Rabat Ajax F.C., St. George's F.C.
 17 seasons: Mosta F.C., Marsa F.C., Naxxar Lions F.C.
 16 seasons: Pieta Hotspurs F.C., Qormi F.C., Tarxien Rainbows F.C., Żurrieq F.C.
 15 seasons: Gzira United F.C.
 14 seasons: Msida St. Joseph F.C.
 13 seasons: Balzan F.C.
 11 seasons: Żebbuġ Rangers F.C.
 10 seasons: Marsaxlokk F.C., St. Andrews
 9 seasons:  Żabbar St. Patrick F.C.
 6 seasons: Senglea Athletic F.C., Melita F.C.
 5 seasons: Lija Athletic F.C., Mqabba F.C., Vittoriosa Stars F.C.
 4 seasons: Gudja United F.C., Santa Lucia F.C., Sirens F.C.
 2 seasons: Pembroke Athleta F.C., Xghajra Tornadoes F.C.
 1 season: Dingli Swallows F.C., Ghaxaq F.C., Gozo F.C., Mellieħa S.C., Żejtun Corinthians F.C.

 teams in bold never been relegated.
 Teams in Italique are Defunct.

Champions 

In total, ten clubs have won the Maltese championship, including titles in the old First Division which was replaced in 1980 by the Premier League. Of the winners, three have been champions more than 20 times: Sliema Wanderers (26 titles), Floriana (26 titles), and Valletta (25 titles).

The honour of Golden Stars was introduced in football to recognize sides that have won multiple championships. In Malta, clubs are permitted to place a golden star above their crest for every ten nation championships won. Sliema Wanderers, Floriana and Valletta boast two golden stars, and Hibernians have one golden star placed above their crest on their jerseys.

Bold teams are Current in the Maltese Premier League.

Italic Season Unbeaten

League appearances

Bold denotes still active players.

References

External links 
 Malta Football Association
 League321.com, Maltese football league tables, records and statistics database
 List of champions and runners-Up, RSSSF

 
1
Malta
1909 establishments in Malta